HD 180262 is a wide double star in the equatorial constellation of Aquila. The pair have an angular separation of 89.823″.

References

External links
 HR 7300
 CCDM 19153+1505
 HD 180262

Aquila (constellation)
180262
Double stars
G-type bright giants
7300
094624
Durchmusterung objects